John Mellencamp is the 15th album by American singer-songwriter and musician John Mellencamp, released on October 6, 1998. It was the first of three albums Mellencamp would record for Columbia Records. "On this record, we ended up quite a bit away from where we started," Mellencamp told Guitar World Acoustic in 1998. "Initially, I wanted to make a record that barely had drums on it. Donovan made a record (in 1966), Sunshine Superman, and I wanted to start with that same kind of vibe—Eastern, very grand stories, fairy tales. We ended up with a few Eastern instruments. But everybody prepared to make that record. After the last tour, I gave everybody Sunshine Superman, and I said: 'Listen to this record, because you're going to need to know it.'"

While it is unusual for an artist to release a self-titled album this late in their career, Mellencamp was asked by Columbia Records to self-title his debut album for them to mark a fresh start and a creative rebirth.

Track listing

Personnel
John Mellencamp – vocals, guitar

Band
Dane Clark – drums, percussion
Toby Myers – bass, vocals
Miriam Sturm – violin, keys, vocals
Mike Wanchic – guitars, vocals
Andy York – guitars, Indian instruments, keys, vocals
Moe Z M.D. – keys, loops, vocals

Guests
Lisa Germano – violin, harmonica on "Miss Missy"
Janas Hoyt – vocals
Killa – vocals
Stan Lynch – drums on "Miss Missy"
Pat Peterson – vocals on "Miss Missy"
Vess "Elvis" Ruhtenberg – bass on "It All Comes True"
Jimmy Ryser – vocals
Izzy Stradlin – guitar on "Miss Missy"

Charts

References

John Mellencamp albums
1998 albums
Columbia Records albums